Rabbit Lake is a lake in eastern Crow Wing County, in the U.S. state of Minnesota. The community of Cuyuna is just south of the lake along Crow Wing County Road 31, which crosses the lake. The Mississippi River flows past just to the north of the lake.

Rabbit Lake is an English translation of the Ojibwe language name.

See also
List of lakes in Minnesota

References

Lakes of Minnesota
Lakes of Crow Wing County, Minnesota